Alina Urushadze (born 7 January 2004) is a Latvian-born Georgian-Russian figure skater who represents Georgia. She is the 2019 Bosphorus Cup silver medalist and the 2019 Volvo Open Cup bronze medalist. She placed 11th at the 2019 World Junior Championships and 5th at the 2020 Winter Youth Olympics.

Career 
Born and raised in Riga, Urushadze previously skated for Latvia. Since October 2018 she represents Georgia.

2018–2019 season
In October 2018, Urushadze made her ISU Junior Grand Prix series debut in Yerevan, Armenia at the 2018 JGP Armenia. Despite placing fifth in both the short program and the free skate, she finished sixth overall and did not receive another Junior Grand Prix assignment for the season. Throughout the rest of the season, Urushadze went on to compete in the junior category at a number of smaller events, before wrapping up with her two largest events of the season: the 2019 European Youth Olympic Winter Festival and the 2019 World Junior Championships. At EYOF, Urushadze placed fourth in the short program, but fell to seventh after the free skate and sixth overall.

At Junior Worlds the following month, Urushadze ranked fifteenth after the short program, which put her in the third-to-last warm-up group for the free skate, where she placed eleventh, rising to eleventh overall.

2019–2020 season
Given two assignments on the Junior Grand Prix, Urushadze placed eighth in France and sixth in Croatia.  After competing at a number of small senior competitions, winning medals at two of them, she competed at the 2020 Winter Youth Olympics in Lausanne, where she placed fifth.  Making her senior ISU Championship debut, she placed fifteenth at the 2020 European Championships.  She concluded the season with a fifteenth-place finish at the 2020 World Junior Championships.

Urushadze had been assigned to make her World Championship debut in Montreal, but they were cancelled as a result of the coronavirus pandemic.

2020–2021 season
With the pandemic continuing to limit international events, the ISU opted to assign the Grand Prix based primarily on geographic location. Urushadze made her Grand Prix debut at the 2020 Rostelecom Cup, finishing tenth among the ten competitors. She placed twentieth at the 2021 World Championships in Stockholm. Urushadze's result qualified a berth for Georgia at the 2022 Winter Olympics.

Programs

Competitive highlights 
GP: Grand Prix; CS: Challenger Series; JGP: Junior Grand Prix

Detailed results

References

External links 

 

2004 births
Latvian female single skaters
Female single skaters from Georgia (country)
Living people
Figure skaters from Moscow
Sportspeople from Riga
Figure skaters at the 2020 Winter Youth Olympics